Thomas P. Miller (1850 – May 29, 1876), nicknamed "Reddy", was an American Major League Baseball catcher who played a total of 59 games during his two-season career.  He played four games for the  Philadelphia Athletics, and 56 games for the  St. Louis Brown Stockings, both of the NAPBBP.  His career statistical totals include: 230 at bats, 19 runs scored, two doubles, and a .187 batting average.

Biography
Miller was born in Philadelphia, Pennsylvania.

He died of kidney problems in Philadelphia on May 29, 1876, a week after he played in an exhibition game and appeared to be in good health. He is interred at Evergreen Memorial Park in Bensalem Township, Pennsylvania, after having been moved from Lafayette Cemetery in Philadelphia.

See also
 List of baseball players who died during their careers

References

External links

1850 births
1876 deaths
Baseball players from Philadelphia
Major League Baseball catchers
19th-century baseball players
Philadelphia Athletics (NA) players
St. Louis Brown Stockings (NA) players
Burials in Pennsylvania